Diego de Estella was a 16th-century Spanish Franciscan mystic and theologian, born 1524 in Estella, Navarra, died  1578 in Salamanca. His secular name was Diego Ballesteros y Cruzas.

Works
Libro de la vanidad del mundo (1562)
Tratado de la vida de San Juan (1554)
Tratado de la vanidad del mundo (second edition) (1574)
Meditaciones dévotisimas del amor de Dios (1578).

He was the author of a book on Saint Luke that was outlawed by the Spanish Inquisition.

References

1524 births
1578 deaths
People from Navarre
16th-century Spanish Roman Catholic theologians
Spanish Franciscans
16th-century Christian mystics
Roman Catholic mystics